Uranium borohydride is the inorganic compound with the empirical formula U(BH4)4. Two polymeric forms are known, as well as a monomeric derivative that exists in the gas phase.  Because the polymers convert to the gaseous form at mild temperatures, uranium borohydride once attracted much attention. It is solid green.

Structure
It is a homoleptic coordination complex with borohydride (also called tetrahydroborate).  These anions can serve as bidentate (κ2-BH4−) bridges between two uranium atoms or as tridentate ligands (κ3-BH4−) on single uranium atoms. In the solid state, a polymeric form exists that has a 14-coordinate structure with two tridentate terminal groups and four bidentate bridging groups.  Gaseous features a monomeric 12-coordinate uranium, with four κ3-BH4− ligands, which envelop the metal, conferring volatility.

Preparation
This compound was first prepared by treating uranium tetrafluoride with aluminium borohydride:
 UF4 + 2 Al(BH4)3 → U(BH4)4 + 2 Al(BH4)F2

It may also be prepared by the solid-state reaction of uranium tetrachloride with lithium borohydride:
UCl4 + 4 LiBH4 → U(BH4)4  +  4 LiCl
Although solid U(BH4)4 is a polymer, it undergoes cracking, converting to the monomer.
The related methylborohydride complex U(BH3CH3)4 is monomeric as a solid and hence more volatile.

History
During the Manhattan Project, the need arose to find volatile compounds of uranium suitable for use in the diffusion separation of uranium isotopes.

Uranium hexafluoride is corrosive, which led to serious consideration of the borohydride. However, by the time the synthesis method was finalized, the problems related to uranium hexafluoride were solved.  Borohydrides are nonideal ligands for isotope separations, since there are isotopes of boron that occur naturally in high abundance: 10B (20%) and 11B (80%), while fluorine-19 is the only isotope of fluorine that occurs in nature in more than trace quantities.

References

Uranium(IV) compounds
Borohydrides